

Chamber of Representatives

Constituencies

Antwerp (24 seats)

Brussels-Halle-Vilvoorde (22 seats)
Major parties:

Minor parties:

East Flanders (20 seats)

Hainaut (19 seats)

Leuven (7 seats)

Liège (15 seats)

Limburg (12 seats)

Luxembourg (4 seats)
Major parties:

Namur (6 seats)

Walloon Brabant (5 seats)

West Flanders (16 seats)

Senate

Electoral colleges

Dutch-speaking (25 seats)

French-speaking (15 seats)

Reference list

Federal elections in Belgium
2010 elections in Belgium
Lists of Belgian political candidates